Pleasant View School for the Arts, frequently referred to as PVSA or simply PV, was a co-educational public magnet school dedicated to the arts in the Plain Local School District in Canton, Ohio. Students from the district's 5 elementary schools were invited to "identify" for the school in the 3rd grade. This "identification" process had students demonstrate their abilities in the four designated Arts: Dance, Music, Drama, and Visual Art. The school accepted an average of 80 students per year, and spanned the 4th-8th grade, though it was technically identified as a middle school.

Kaleidoscope 

Kaleidoscope was the school's gifted education program. It accepted an initial class of about 15 students per year, based on district-wide scores on the California Achievement Test. The program would accept 2-3 more students per year, based on test scores and vacancies. Students accepted were in the 99th percentile of test takers.

Closing 

When the district restructured in 2006, Pleasant View officially closed its doors. The district claims to be integrating the programs offered through PV into the new middle schools, Glenwood and Oakwood.

The building, which was in notorious disrepair during its later years, was bulldozed in 2007, and the former location, 3000 Columbus Ave. is now an empty lot.

References

External links 
 Pleasant View Website c.2001 cached by the Internet Archive.

Canton, Ohio
Demolished buildings and structures in Ohio
Educational institutions disestablished in 2006
Educational institutions established in 1987
Defunct schools in Ohio
1987 establishments in Ohio